Vulaï (also Île Wulei, Île Woulei) is a small inhabited island in Malampa Province of Vanuatu in the Pacific Ocean. It is a part of the Maskelyne Islands archipelago. The island is also known as Harper Island.

Geography
Vulaï lies off the southeastern coast of Malekula Island. The estimated terrain elevation above sea level is 9 metres.

References

Islands of Vanuatu
Malampa Province